USS LST-59 was a  which earned one battle star for service in World War II.

The ship was laid down by the Dravo Corporation of Pittsburgh, Pennsylvania, on 7 November 1943. Launched on 18 December 1943, sponsored by Mrs. Richard A. Lewis. Commissioned on 31 January 1944.

Between 6–25 June 1944 LST-59 participated in the invasion of Normandy. On 29 June 1944 the 5th Naval Beach Battalion returned from Normandy to England aboard.

The ship was decommissioned on 21 January 1946, and struck from the Navy List on 25 February 1946. Subsequently sold to Southern Shipwrecking Company of New Orleans in September 1947, and scrapped.

See also
List of United States Navy LSTs

References

World War II amphibious warfare vessels of the United States
Ships built in Pittsburgh
1943 ships
LST-1-class tank landing ships of the United States Navy
Ships built by Dravo Corporation